Mystra may refer to
 Mystra, a Byzantine city and archaeological site in Greece today known as Mystras
 Mystra (Forgotten Realms), a deity in the Dungeons and Dragons game universe Forgotten Realms